A by-election was held for the New South Wales Legislative Assembly electorate of Peats on 2 February 1985 because of the death of Paul Landa.

The Peats by-election was held the same day as the Murray by-election.

Dates

Result

	

Paul Landa died.

See also
Electoral results for the district of Peats
List of New South Wales state by-elections

References 

1985 elections in Australia
New South Wales state by-elections
1980s in New South Wales